St John Paul College (originally named John Paul College after Pope John Paul II, renamed on 27 August 2014 following his canonization) is a Catholic independent secondary school in Coffs Harbour, New South Wales, Australia.

John Paul College was opened in 1983 with Years 7 and 8, and was the culmination of many years of planning by the parish priest of Coffs Harbour, Father Anthony Casey and the Parents' Planning Committee.

Land on Hogbin Drive was donated by Paddy Hargraves. The first stage of construction was completed in 1982; the second stage was commenced in 1985 and opened in 1986, followed by the opening of the chapel (now drama) and multi-purpose hall in 1987. After the school had grown to nearly 1000 students, a new block was opened in 1992 and named Nagle Block after the foundress of the Presentation Order. To commemorate the contribution of the Sisters of Mercy to John Paul College, 1983 through 1992, the library was dedicated to Catherine McAuley, their foundress. A larger chapel "Stella Maris" was added in 1996.

College colours are sky blue, maroon and navy. The student population is divided into four houses, Casey, Hargraves, Kelly and McAuley, mostly for sports, with teams and individual sports people participating in all sports. The houses were all named after founding figures of John Paul College, and have house colours affiliated with them (green, blue, yellow and red respectively).

See also 

 List of non-government schools in New South Wales
 Catholic education in Australia

References

External links
 

Catholic secondary schools in New South Wales
Educational institutions established in 1983
1983 establishments in Australia
Education in Coffs Harbour